Ian William Freeman (born 11 October 1966) is a retired  English mixed martial artist who was the  Cage Rage World Heavyweight Champion and the final Cage Rage British Light Heavyweight Champion. He was the first British person to fight in the UFC, as well as the first person to beat Frank Mir.

Martial arts background 
Freeman came into martial arts from boxing, in which he had trained for around ten years, after being taught by his father, who was an ABA Boxing Champion at 18 years of age. While working as a doorman, Freeman ended up fighting with a man who was intoxicated; a friend mentioned that rather than punch him, he should have broke the mans arm. Curious as to what he could learn, he started training in Goshin jiu-jitsu for around six to eight months before competing in an amateur Vale Tudo competition. In his early days, he trained periodically with various instructors, including Marco Ruas and Renzo Gracie.

Mixed martial arts career 
Freeman entered the professional circuit in 1999. He was considered an early ambassador for mixed martial arts and given the nickname, "The Iron Ambassador." In early 2000, the UFC approached Ian to fight at UFC 24, where he lost to Scott Adams via achilles lock submission. He fought two more times in the UFC, winning both times. Later, Freeman's career hit a low point with four losses in a row, but he returned with a submission win in a rematch with Stanislav Nuschik.

His greatest triumph was arguably his win on home soil over Frank Mir at UFC 38. The heavy underdog, Freeman lived up to his nickname as he systematically ground Mir down and broke his spirit, winning a first round stoppage in front of the English crowd. The match was bittersweet for Freeman, having dedicated the match to his father who, unbeknown to him, had died of cancer the day before. Victory gave Freeman the chance to make his mark on the UFC Heavyweight division but his next fight saw him stopped by Andrei Arlovski. Seven months later, a draw against Vernon White signalled the end of Freeman's second stint in UFC and led to his return to the British MMA scene.

After one successful fight for the Cage Warriors promotion, Ian took a break from MMA, citing chronic fatigue syndrome and an overly intense training schedule. He returned eleven months later to fight Ryan Robinson for the vacant Cage Rage Heavyweight title. Defeating Robinson within one round with his now-customary ground and pound, Freeman vacated the title and announced he was dropping to Light Heavyweight. In early 2005, Ian again appeared to ebb away from MMA, appearing as a referee in ITV's ill-fated Celebrity Wrestling game show, which was quickly relegated to Sunday mornings and subsequently cancelled.

Retirement
Freeman was scheduled to return to the UFC to fight Forrest Griffin at UFC 55 - Fury but suffered a horse-riding accident and was unable to compete. After not competing for nearly nine months, he announced his retirement from competitive MMA. He later cited the return of chronic fatigue as a factor in his layoff and subsequent retirement.

Comeback 
After a year-long layoff, he returned to training. He approached Cage Rage and was soon offered a match against the Cage Rage World Light Heavyweight champion Melvin Manhoef in 2006 at Cage Rage 17. Originally slated as a "super-bout" at a catchweight of 96 kg (211 lbs), Manhoef asked for the fight to take place at the light heavyweight limit of 93 kg (205 lbs), which placed his World Light Heavyweight title on the line. Freeman lost the fight by KO in just 17 seconds.

Freeman got a shot at British Light Heavyweight champion Mark Epstein at Cage Rage 18 on 30 September 2006. Freeman overpowered Epstein with his ground-and-pound tactic, winning his second Cage Rage title. Freeman then trained at the TSG MMA (Team Sure Grip Mixed Martial Arts) School under Daniel Burzotta to fight Paul Cahoon for the British Cage Rage Light Heavyweight title on 10 May 2008 at Cage Rage 26. He won unanimously after three rounds.

In his first bout since 2008, Freeman was expected to fight UFC Hall of Famer Ken Shamrock at an Ultimate Cage Fighting Championships event on 27 July 2013. The fight with Shamrock was cancelled due to contractual issues on Shamrock's part.

After Shamrock backed out of the fight he was replaced by Ricco Rodriguez. Ian won by TKO, stopping Rodriguez at 2:06 of Round 1.

Shortly after this win, Freeman retired from competition, citing his age and health issues.

Outside of fighting
His autobiography, "Cage Fighter: The True Story of Ian 'The Machine' Freeman", was published in 2004 by Blake Publishing.

In 2004 he was the referee on the game show Britain's Hardest, which ran for 10 episodes on Sky 1.

On 1 November 2006 it was announced that Ian was due to coach a British-based team that would have participated in the International Fight League from 2008, had the promotion not shut down due to financial difficulties.

In 2005, Ian was the referee on ITV's ill-fated Celebrity Wrestling gameshow. Freeman also starred in the 2008 British boxing action-comedy film Sucker Punch.

Ian was the ring announcer for M-1 Global: Breakthrough, which took place on 28 August 2009 at Memorial Hall, in Kansas City, Kansas.

Ian has recently agreed to be ring announcer for Clan Wars, Ireland's first Pro ISKA governed MMA competition.

In 2010, Ian worked as spokesman for the now defunct Kudegra Fighting Championship, shortly after he parted company with the promotion.

In 2019, his daughter Kennedy was signed to Bellator.

Convictions 
In 2009, Freeman was sentenced to nine months in prison, suspended for a year, for tax fraud, as he had not declared earnings from his fighting career and had also fraudulently claimed £12,352 in tax credits with his wife. He was additionally ordered to complete 120 hours community service and wear an electronic tag. His wife was sentenced to a six-week community order and also electronically tagged.

Mixed martial arts record 

|-
| Win
| align=center| 20–7–1
| Ricco Rodriguez
| TKO (punches)
| UCFC 5: Legends of MMA
| 
| align=center|1
| align=center|2:11
| Doncaster, England
| 
|-
| Win
| align=center| 19–7–1
| Paul Cahoon
| Decision (unanimous)
| Cage Rage 26
| 
| align=center| 3
| align=center| 5:00
| Birmingham, England
| 
|-
| Win
| align=center| 18–7–1
| Mark Epstein
| Decision (unanimous)
| Cage Rage 18
| 
| align=center| 3
| align=center| 5:00
| London, England
| 
|-
| Loss
| align=center| 17–7–1
| Melvin Manhoef
| KO (punches)
| Cage Rage 17
| 
| align=center| 1
| align=center| 0:17
| London, England
| 
|-
| Win
| align=center| 17–6–1
| Will Elworthy
| TKO (punches)
| House of Pain 1
| 
| align=center| 1
| align=center| N/A
| Swansea, Wales
| 
|-
| Win
| align=center| 16–6–1
| Ryan Robinson
| TKO (punches)
| Cage Rage 9
| 
| align=center| 1
| align=center| 2:44
| London, England
| 
|-
| Win
| align=center| 15–6–1
| Keith Dace
| TKO (punches)
| CWFC 5: Cage Warriors 5
| 
| align=center| 1
| align=center| 0:47
| South Shields, England
| 
|-
| Draw
| align=center| 14–6–1
| Vernon White
| Draw (split)
| UFC 43
| 
| align=center| 3
| align=center| 5:00
| Paradise, Nevada, United States
| 
|-
| Win
| align=center| 14–6
| Gerhard Ettl
| Submission (armbar)
| FFAA: Fight Night Championships 4
| 
| align=center| 2
| align=center| 1:40
| Graz, Austria
| 
|-
| Loss
| align=center| 13–6
| Andrei Arlovski
| TKO (punches)
| UFC 40
| 
| align=center| 1
| align=center| 1:25
| Las Vegas, Nevada, United States
| 
|-
| Win
| align=center| 13–5
| Frank Mir
| TKO (punches)
| UFC 38
| 
| align=center| 1
| align=center| 4:35
| London, England
| 
|-
| Win
| align=center| 12–5
| Carlos Barreto
| Decision (unanimous)
| HOOKnSHOOT: Kings 1
| 
| align=center| 3
| align=center| 5:00
| Evansville, Indiana, United States
| 
|-
| Win
| align=center| 11–5
| Stanislav Nuschik
| Submission (front choke)
| FFAA: Fight Night Championship 3
| 
| align=center| 1
| align=center| 1:57
| Graz, Austria
| 
|-
| Loss
| align=center| 10–5
| Stanislav Nuschik
| KO (punch)
| M-1 MFC: Russia vs. the World 1
| 
| align=center| 1
| align=center| 0:20
| St. Petersburg, Russia
| 
|-
| Loss
| align=center| 10–4
| Valentijn Overeem
| TKO (doctor stoppage)
| 2 Hot 2 Handle: Simply The Best
| 
| align=center| 1
| align=center| 1:42
| Rotterdam, The Netherlands
| 
|-
| Loss
| align=center| 10–3
| Osami Shibuya
| TKO (rib injury)
| Pancrase: Proof 1
| 
| align=center| 1
| align=center| 3:51
| Tokyo, Japan
| 
|-
| Loss
| align=center| 10–2
| Bob Schrijber
| TKO (doctor stoppage)
| It's Showtime: Christmas Edition
| 
| align=center| 1
| align=center| 1:28
| Haarlem, The Netherlands
| 
|-
| Win
| align=center| 10–1
| Tedd Williams
| Decision (unanimous)
| UFC 27
| 
| align=center| 3
| align=center| 5:00
| New Orleans, Louisiana, United States
| 
|-
| Win
| align=center| 9–1
| Bob Stines
| KO (punch)
| Pancrase: 2000 Neo-Blood Tournament Opening Round
| 
| align=center| 1
| align=center| 2:38
| Tokyo, Japan
| 
|-
| Win
| align=center| 8–1
| Nate Schroeder
| TKO (submission to punches)
| UFC 26
| 
| align=center| 2
| align=center| 2:13
| Cedar Rapids, Iowa, United States
| 
|-
| Loss
| align=center| 7–1
| Scott Adams
| Submission (Achilles lock)
| UFC 24
| 
| align=center| 1
| align=center| 3:09
| Lake Charles, Louisiana, United States
| 
|-
| Win
| align=center| 7–0
| Travis Fulton
| TKO (retirement)
| Millennium Brawl 1
| 
| align=center| 2
| align=center| 5:00
| England
| 
|-
| Win
| align=center| 6–0
| Dave Shortby
| TKO (punches)
| Total Fight KRG 5
| 
| align=center| 1
| align=center| 2:02
| Buckinghamshire, England
| 
|-
| Win
| align=center| 5–0
| Mark Lamborn
| Submission (rear-naked choke)
| British Vale Tudo
| 
| align=center| 1
| align=center| 0:55
| England
| 
|-
| Win
| align=center| 4–0
| Keith Dace
| Submission (guillotine choke)
| British Vale Tudo
| 
| align=center| 1
| align=center| 0:46
| England
| 
|-
| Win
| align=center| 3–0
| Kamal Lock
| Submission (ankle lock)
| British Grand Prix '99
| 
| align=center| 1
| align=center| 3:55
| England
| 
|-
| Win
| align=center| 2–0
| Scotty Smith
| TKO
| British Grand Prix '99
| 
| align=center| 1
| align=center| 0:09
| England
| 
|-
| Win
| align=center| 1–0
| Tony Bailey
| Submission (guillotine choke)
| British Grand Prix '99
| 
| align=center| 1
| align=center| 1:32
| England
|

References

External links 
 
 
 
 "Fighters Only" magazine
 Ian Freeman's Website

1966 births
Sportspeople from Sunderland
Living people
People with chronic fatigue syndrome
English male mixed martial artists
Light heavyweight mixed martial artists
Mixed martial artists utilizing boxing
Mixed martial artists utilizing jujutsu
Mixed martial artists utilizing Brazilian jiu-jitsu
Ultimate Fighting Championship male fighters
English jujutsuka
English practitioners of Brazilian jiu-jitsu